Galan Ridge is a prominent ridge which forms the northeastern rampart of the Dana Mountains in Palmer Land, Antarctica. It was mapped by the United States Geological Survey from ground surveys and U.S. Navy air photos, 1961–67, and was named by the Advisory Committee on Antarctic Names for Michael P. Galan, a member of the McMurdo Station winter party in 1967 and of the South Pole—Queen Maud Land Traverse III in 1967–68.

References

Ridges of Palmer Land